The Aztec, New Mexico UFO hoax (sometimes known as the "other Roswell") was a flying saucer crash alleged to have happened in 1948 in Aztec, New Mexico. The story was first published in 1949 by author Frank Scully in his Variety magazine columns, and later in his 1950 book Behind the Flying Saucers. In the mid-1950s, the story was exposed as a hoax fabricated by two con men, Silas M. Newton and Leo A. Gebauer, as part of a fraudulent scheme to sell supposed alien technology. Beginning in the 1970s, some ufologists resurrected the story in books claiming the purported crash was real. In 2013, an FBI memo claimed by some ufologists to substantiate the crash story was dismissed by the bureau as "a second- or third-hand claim that we never investigated".

Story

According to Scully, in March 1948 an unidentified aerial craft containing sixteen humanoid bodies was recovered by the military in New Mexico after making a controlled landing in Hart Canyon 12 miles northeast of the city of Aztec. The craft was said to be  in diameter, the largest UFO to date. Scully named as his sources two men identified as Newton and Gebauer, who reportedly told him the incident had been covered up and "the military had taken the craft for secret research".

Scully wrote that the crashed UFO along with other flying saucers captured by the government came from Venus and worked on "magnetic principles". According to Scully, the inhabitants stocked concentrated food wafers and "heavy water" for drinking purposes, and every dimension of the craft was "divisible by nine". Science writer Martin Gardner criticized Scully's story as full of "wild imaginings" and "scientific howlers".

Hoax
During the late 1940s and early 50s, Silas Newton and Leo A. Gebauer traveled through Aztec, attempting to sell devices known in the oil business as "doodlebugs." They claimed that these devices could find  oil, gas and gold, and that they could do so because they were based on "alien technology" recovered from the supposed crash of a flying saucer. When J. P. Cahn of the San Francisco Chronicle asked the con-men for a piece of metal from the supposed alien devices, they provided him with a sample that turned out to be ordinary aluminium. In 1949, author Frank Scully published a series of columns in Variety magazine retelling the crash story told to him by Newton and Gebauer. He later expanded these columns to create "Behind the Flying Saucers", a best selling book that influenced public perceptions about UFOs. Four years later the hoax was exposed in True magazine. After the article was published, many victims of the pair came forward. One of the victims was the millionaire Herman Flader, who pressed charges. The two were convicted of fraud in 1953.

Ufologists
Through the mid-1950s to the early 1970s, most Ufologists considered the subject thoroughly discredited and therefore avoided it. However, in the late 70s, author Leonard Stringfield purported that not only was the incident real, but that the craft involved was one of many captured and stored by the U.S. military. In later years, many alleged 'first hand' accounts of the Roswell crash contained the Aztec crash story, with some claiming the craft was made of a material impervious to all heat, while others claiming the craft was damaged by the crash. Ufologists claim that shortly after the craft was downed, the military cleared the area of evidence, including the bodies—subsequently taking it to Hangar 18 at Wright-Patterson Air Force Base.

FBI memo
In April 2011, UFO enthusiasts discovered what has come to be known as the "Hottel memo", which was available for viewing on the FBI's 'Vault' website. Though the memo had never been classified, and had been making the rounds online for some years, it was seen as proof of an official cover-up by the US government. The memo contained the report of a man named Guy Hottel, who was the FBI agent in charge of the Washington field office at the time. It was addressed to J. Edgar Hoover and indexed in the FBI records, but this was standard practice at the time. It was later discovered that Hottel's story was a retelling of a retelling of a January 6, 1950 article published in the Wyandotte Echo, a Kansas City, Kansas, legal newspaper. The Wyandotte Echo article itself was a retelling of the account of a local car-salesman and radio station advertising manager. Ultimately the details within the FBI memo can be traced directly back to the initial hoax story. After the memo was posted on the FBI website, it received over a million views within 2 years.

In 2013, the FBI issued a press release concerning the memo. In addressing the memo's context and possible connection to a hoax, the Bureau wrote, "Finally, the Hottel memo does not prove the existence of UFOs; it is simply a second- or third-hand claim that we never investigated. Some people believe the memo repeats a hoax that was circulating at that time, but the Bureau’s files have no information to verify that theory."

Fundraiser
The incident gave birth to the Aztec UFO Symposium, which was run by the Aztec, New Mexico library as a fundraiser from 1997 until 2011.

See also
 Twin Falls Saucer Hoax
 The Bamboo Saucer, a 1968 film about a crashed saucer with dead bodies being recovered by Soviet and American forces from Red China
 Hangar 18, a 1980 film about a crashed craft with dead bodies
 List of reported UFO sightings

References

Further reading
 
 
 

UFO hoaxes
Hoaxes in the United States
History of San Juan County, New Mexico
1948 in New Mexico